The 2002 J.League Division 2 season is the 31st season of the second-tier club football in Japan and the 4th season since the establishment of J2 League.

Starting this season, extra-time rule was abolished and the league adopted the traditional 3-1-0 points system. The twelve clubs competed in the quadruple round-robin format. The top two received promotion to the J.League Division 1. There were no relegation to the third-tier Japan Football League.

Clubs 

Following twelve clubs played in J.League Division 2 during 2002 season. Of these clubs, Cereso Osaka and Avispa Fukuoka were relegated from J1 League last year.

 Montedio Yamagata
 Mito HollyHocks
 Omiya Ardija
 Kawasaki Frontale
 Yokohama F.C.
 Shonan Bellmare
 Ventforet Kofu
 Albirex Niigata
 Cerezo Osaka
 Avispa Fukuoka
 Sagan Tosu
 Oita Trinita

League format 
Twelve clubs will play in quadruple round-robin format, a total of 44 games each. A club receives 3 points for a win, 1 point for a tie, and 0 points for a loss. The clubs are ranked by points, and tie breakers are, in the following order:
 Goal differential
 Goals scored
 Head-to-head results
A draw would be conducted, if necessary. However, if two clubs are tied at the first place, both clubs will be declared as the champions. The top two clubs are promoted to J1.

Final league table

Final results

Top scorers 

J2 League seasons
2
Japan
Japan